Alexander Matheson  is a pharmacist, businessman, and local politician from Stornoway, now serving as Lord Lieutenant of the Western Isles.

Matheson became the youngest Provost of Stornoway in 1971, serving until 1975. In 1973, he was appointed to the Western Isles health board, becoming its chairman in 1993 until 2001. Matheson was elected to Comhairle nan Eilean Siar in 1974 and served as Convenor from 1982 until 1990. He was appointed Chairman of Highlands and Islands Airports Ltd.in 2001 and served until 2007. A member of the Harris Tweed Authority between 1995 and 2007 he was chairman from 2001 to 2007. He served on Stornoway Trust Estate for 40 years from 1967 until 2007 and was chairman from 1971 until 1981. In 1972 he was appointed as an Honorary Sheriff at Stornoway and continues to hold that warrant. He served on Stornoway Pier and Harbour Commission (now Stornoway Port Authority between 1968 and 2009 and was chairman from 1970 to 1972 and again from 1991 to 2001. He was President of the Islands Commission of The Conference of Peripheral Maritime Regions of Europe between 1987 and 1991.

Matheson is the chairman of Roderick Smith Ltd., his family business. He was awarded the OBE in 1990. In 1993, he was made a Fellow of the Royal Pharmaceutical Society of Great Britain and a deputy lieutenant of the Western Isles. He became Vice Lord-Lieutenant in 1994, and also served as Convenor for the Western Isles Council. He was appointed Lord Lieutenant in 2001.

He was appointed Commander of the Royal Victorian Order (CVO) in the 2016 New Year Honours.

References

|-

Year of birth missing (living people)
Living people
Lord-Lieutenants of the Western Isles
Officers of the Order of the British Empire
Scottish pharmacists
People from Stornoway
Commanders of the Royal Victorian Order